The inelegant frog (Cophixalus infacetus) is a species of frog in the family Microhylidae. It is also known as the creaking frog or the creaking nursery frog due to its singular call.
It is endemic to Australia.
Its natural habitat is subtropical or tropical moist lowland forests.
It is threatened by habitat loss.

References

Cophixalus
Amphibians of Queensland
Taxonomy articles created by Polbot
Amphibians described in 1985
Frogs of Australia